Richard J. Bridges (born November 16, 1955) is an American pharmacologist and Regents Professor of Pharmacology and Toxicology at the University of Montana.

References 

American pharmacologists
University of Montana faculty
Living people
1955 births
Cornell University alumni